FBAR may refer to:

Thin film bulk acoustic resonator
Department of the Treasury Form 90-22.1 Report of Foreign Bank and Financial Accounts